Evarcha maculata is a jumping spider species in the genus Evarcha. The species was first described in 2002 and lives in Ethiopia and Guinea.

References

Salticidae
Fauna of Ethiopia
Fauna of Guinea
Spiders of Africa
Spiders described in 2002
Taxa named by Wanda Wesołowska